Mr. St. Nick is a 2002 Christmas comedy-fantasy film starring Kelsey Grammer. It was produced by Hallmark Entertainment and shown on ABC in the United States. It was first broadcast as an episode of ABC's Wonderful World of Disney anthology on November 17, 2002.

It was set mainly in Miami, Florida, United States, although it was filmed in Vancouver, British Columbia, Canada.

Plot 
King Nicholas XX (Durning) has been Santa Claus for 100 years and is now preparing to hand over the baton to his, and the Queen's (Helmond) son, Nick St. Nicholas (Grammer).  Nick St. Nicholas is living the high life in Miami and is slightly reluctant to become Santa Claus. Jasper (Bedford), Nick's butler hires a new cook, Lorena (Ortiz). He then gets enticed into portraying a fictitious Santa Claus for a charity (Mr.SaintNick.com) by Heidi (Hendrix) and Hector (Garcia). Nick begins to fall in love with Heidi and asks her to marry him, little does he know that Hector and Heidi are transferring the charity's money into their own account in the Cayman Islands. Soon however, Nick starts to become closer to his loved ones (namely his father) and Nick starts to realizes how special being with your loved ones is. As that happens he also notices that he is getting to know Lorena better and is starting to develop feelings for her as well, which makes him re-think about marrying Heidi. Nick eventually comes to see that he was wrong about everything and chooses Lorena instead.

Cast 
 Kelsey Grammer as Nick St. Nicholas / Santa Claus the 21st
 Charles Durning as King Nicholas XX (Santa Claus)
 Katherine Helmond as Queen Carlotta
 Brian Bedford as Jasper
 Elaine Hendrix as Heidi Gardelle
 Ana Ortiz as Lorena
 Luis Garcia as Hector Villarba
 Wallace Shawn as Mimir
 Veena Sood as Mrs. Sarathi

See also
 List of Christmas films
 Santa Claus in film
 List of television films produced for American Broadcasting Company

External links 
 
 

American Christmas films
Santa Claus in film
American television films
Christmas television films
2002 television films
2002 films
Santa Claus in television
2000s Christmas films